Yawata Steel Works dam collapse occurred on May 1, 1916 in Yahata, Fukuoka when the Great Dam collapsed killing hundreds and crushing thousands of homes.

Background

By 1912, 80% of Japan's pig iron production was from Yawata Steel Works. An integrated mill with coke, iron, and steel facilities, Yahata was also responsible at this time for 80-90% of Japan's steel output. Energy efficiency was greatly improved by the conversion from steam to electricity as a power source, resulting in a drop in consumption of coal per ton of steel produced from four tons in 1920 to 1.58 in 1933. Much of the iron ore was from China and Korea. To supply the energy to the Steelworks a large dam was created.

The factories covered many acres and a town sprang up nearby, Yahata, Fukuoka to supply the workers.

Dam break
On May 1, 1916, American media reported that the "Great Dam" at the Yawata Steel Works had collapsed and completely submerged a section of the manufacturing city. Initial reports stated that hundreds of people were killed and thousands made homeless.  They army was sent in to help with the recovery.

See also
Kawachi Dam finished 1927
Aburagi Dam finished 1971

Bibliography 
Notes

References 

 - Total pages: 324 

 

Dams in Fukuoka Prefecture 
Dam failures in Asia
Man-made disasters in Japan
2016 disasters in Japan